A tiara (from , from ) is a jeweled head ornament. Its origins date back to ancient Greece and Rome. In the late 18th century, the tiara came into fashion in Europe as a prestigious piece of jewelry to be worn by women at formal occasions. The basic shape of the modern tiara is a (semi-)circle, usually made of silver, gold or platinum, and richly decorated with precious stones, pearls or cameos.

Tiaras were extremely popular during the late 19th century and were worn at events where the dress code was white tie. After World War I, wearing a tiara gradually fell out of fashion, except for official occasions at a royal court. Interest in tiaras has increased again since the beginning of the 21st century. The word "tiara" is often used interchangeably with the word "diadem".

Description 
The basic shape of the modern tiara is a (semi-)circle, usually made of silver, gold or platinum. Tiaras have also been made from tortoiseshell, coral and quartz, and in the 20th century unusual materials such as horn and aluminum were experimented with.

Tiaras are usually richly decorated with precious stones, pearls or cameos, often arranged in symmetrical patterns. Common elements in these patterns are arcs, garlands, circles, stars, and stylised flowers or leaves. Occasionally, flowers, ears of corn, dragonflies or butterflies are depicted more or less 'true to life' by using gemstones in different colours. A tiara can contain hundreds to thousands of gemstones of different sizes and cuts; almost always, tiaras incorporate a large number of diamonds. This puts tiaras among the most expensive and spectacular pieces of jewelry.

Tiaras come in different models, including:

 the bandeau, a tiara in the shape of a ribbon or hairband,
 the kokoshnik, a tiara that usually consists of a massive wall of gemstones; the shape is based on the traditional Russian headdress with the same name,
 the circlet, a tiara that extends around the circumference of the head,
 the fringe, a fringed trim of diamonds that can often also be worn as a necklace.

 
Tiaras are worn on the head, but also around the forehead; this depends on the model of the tiara and the fashion of the day. Wearing a tiara can lead to headaches. To make it more comfortable to wear, a large tiara is often attached to a supporting frame that is cushioned by wrapping it with velvet ribbons.

Some tiaras can be disassembled into elements that can be worn individually as a necklace or brooch. Tiaras are sometimes part of a parure: a matching set of, for example, tiara, necklace, earrings, brooches and bracelets.

Etiquette 

It is sometimes thought that only titled women are allowed to wear a tiara; that is not true. Any woman can wear a tiara to events where the dress code 'white tie' applies. However events in hotels are excluded.

Traditionally, young women do not wear a tiara until they are married. On their wedding day, they would wear a tiara owned by their birth family. Once a woman was married, she should only wear tiaras that were owned by her husband's family, or her own personal property. There was an exception for unmarried princesses who were allowed to wear tiaras from the age of eighteen. In the 21st century, these rules are no longer strictly applied.

There are special black tiaras made of jet, onyx, glass or steel to be worn with mourning clothes. For the later stages of mourning (second mourning and half mourning), tiaras with purple stones (amethyst), white stones (diamond and moonstone) or pearls were also considered appropriate.

History

Pre-18th century 
The words tiara and diadem both come from head ornaments worn in ancient time by men and women to denote high status.  As Geoffrey Munn notes, "The word 'tiara' is actually Persian in origin—the name first denoted the high-peaked head-dresses of Persian kings, which were encircled by 'diadems' (bands of purple and white decoration). Now, it is used to describe almost every form of decorative head ornament."  Ancient Greeks and Romans used gold to make wreath-shaped head ornaments, while the Scythians' resembled a stiff halo that would serve as the inspiration for later Russian kokoshniks. The use of tiaras and diadems declined along with the fall of the Roman Empire and the rise of Christianity.

From the early Middle Ages onwards, European princesses and queens were known to wear crowns, and brides wore special bridal crowns on their wedding day. In the 17th and 18th centuries, reigning queens began to wear head ornaments to indicate their special status. This custom did not catch on widely, partly because the enormous ladies' hairstyles of the eighteenth century made wearing a tiara difficult.

18th and 19th century 

In the late 18th century, Neoclassicism gave rise to a revival of tiaras, but this time it was a solely female adornment. Jewelers taking inspiration from Ancient Greece and Rome created new wreaths made from precious gemstones. Napoleon and his wife Joséphine de Beauharnais are credited with popularizing tiaras along with the new Empire style.  Napoleon wanted the French court to be the grandest in Europe and gave his wife many parures which included tiaras.  A number of tiaras made for Napoleon's first wife Joséphine are still in the possession of European royal houses, such as the Swedish cameo tiara.

In the 19th century, the tiara quickly became popular among royal and noble women as a way of expressing status and attracting attention. The tiara became an essential part of women's attire for court ceremonies, balls, dinners and other gala occasions. Often, a bride received a tiara as a gift from her husband or father on her wedding day.

The height of the tiara's popularity lay between 1890 and 1914. Women from the highest - and richest - social classes often had several tiaras to choose from. Wearing a tiara was no longer something just for the nobility. In the United States, too, tiaras were common at gala occasions, especially in New York upper social circles. Great jewelry houses like Garrard, Fabergé, Chaumet, Cartier and Van Cleef & Arpels all produced tiaras for their clientele.

20th and 21st century 

With the advent of Jugendstil and Art Nouveau, the line between jewellery and art became blurred. Artists such as René Lalique and the British architect and jewellery designer Henry Wilson created artistic tiaras that could not easily be worn in real life.

After the First World War, it became less fashionable to wear a tiara. This was due to social and economic changes (ostentatious display of wealth was considered less acceptable) but also to the fact that women cut their hair short and - after the introduction of shampoo - washed their hair more often. Clean hair is smooth and soft, offering less 'grip' for a tiara. During the Art Deco period between World War I and World War II, tiaras were made using the rigid geometric patterns associated with this style; these were also often designed to be easy to wear with short hair. In the 1960s, the tiara briefly reappeared when the high-cropped beehive hairstyle became popular.

Since the end of the twentieth century, tiaras are worn almost exclusively at state banquets, royal weddings and coronations.  At 'white-tie' occasions a tiara is no longer required. However, tiaras are still being made and some auction houses and jewellers are seeing an increased interest in tiaras since the beginning of the 21st century. Fashion designer Versace made a tiara which was worn by pop star Madonna. The Danish royal family has a tiara on loan that was designed  in 2009 for an exhibition of classic and modern tiaras.

Collections 
Queen Elizabeth II is said to have had the largest and most valuable collection of tiaras in the world, many of which are heirlooms of the British royal family. She was often seen wearing them on state occasions. The Queen inherited many of them, especially from Queen Alexandra. She also inherited a number of tiaras designed by Prince Albert for Queen Victoria. Queen Mary purchased the Grand Duchess Vladimir tiara in the 1920s. It consists of numerous interlocking diamond circles. Pearl drops or emeralds can be attached inside the circles. Queen Mary had a tiara made for the Delhi Durbar held in 1911 in India. It is now on loan for wearing by Camilla, Queen Consort of the United Kingdom, wife of King Charles III. Queen Elizabeth II commissioned a ruby and diamond tiara. A gift of aquamarines she received as a present from the people of Brazil were added to diamonds to make a new tiara.

Other queens, empresses, and princesses regularly wear tiaras at formal evening occasions. The Swedish Royal Family have a collection as do the Danish, the Dutch, and Spanish monarchies. Many of the Danish royal jewels originally came into the collection when Princess Louise of Sweden married the future King Frederick VIII of Denmark. The Romanov dynasty had a collection up until the revolution of 1917. The Iranian royal family also had a large collection of tiaras. Since the Iranian Revolution, they are housed at the National Jewelry Museum in Tehran.

On rare occasions, usually when the actual tiara is exceptionally old and valuable due to its history and gemstones, realistic copies may be made and worn in place of the original due to insurance considerations.

Costume jewellery tiaras
Tiaras made of plastic, rhinestones, Swarovski crystals, or any other non-precious material are considered costume jewelry. They are worn by women on special occasions such as homecoming or prom and at their quinceañera (fifteenth birthday) or wedding.  They are also worn by the winners of beauty pageants and children dressing up as Disney princesses.

Stage and screen
Tiaras are often worn by actresses in film, plays, and television.  In 2013, Cartier created a replica of the ruby and diamond tiara they had originally made in 1956 for Princess Grace of Monaco for the film Grace of Monaco, starring Nicole Kidman.

See also
 Aigrette
 Circlet
 Civic crown
 Coronet
 Crown
 Diadem
 Elizabeth II's jewels
 Headband
 Laurel wreath
 Liangbatou
 Military tiara
 Mural crown
 Papal tiara
 The Swedish Royal Family's jewelry
 Tainia

References

External links

The Royal Collection tiaras of Queen Elizabeth II

Crowns (headgear)
Types of jewellery